The Prime Minister's Office (Urdu: دفترِ وزیرِ اعظم) is the principal workplace of the Prime Minister of Pakistan and is headed by the Principal Secretary to the Prime Minister of Pakistan, Syed Tauqir Shah. 

It is responsible for formulating policies for the Prime Minister's cabinet, conducting its cabinet meetings, and supervising and overseeing the implementation of the Cabinet's policy. 

In addition, it is in charge of other governmental bodies, which report directly to the Prime Minister. 

The Prime Minister's Office is located on Red Zone, Islamabad, Pakistan.

References

Buildings and structures in Islamabad
Pakistan
Continuity of government in Pakistan

Government buildings in Pakistan